Þuríður Backman (born 8 January 1948) is a member of parliament of the Althing, the Icelandic parliament. She is a member of the Left-Green Movement. She has been Deputy Speaker of the Althing since 2003, and a member of the Icelandic Delegation to the Inter-Parliamentary Union since 2007.

External links
Althing biography

Living people
1948 births
Thuridur Backman
Thuridur Backman
Thuridur Backman
Thuridur Backman
Thuridur Backman
Thuridur Backman